Air Vice-Marshal Richard Clark Maddison  is a senior Royal Air Force officer.

RAF career
Richard Maddison was commissioned into the RAF on 15 December 1988. After being awarded the Queen's Commendation for Valuable Service during a tour in Northern Ireland, he became station commander at RAF Odiham and Chinook Force commander in October 2013 and Head of Capability Joint Plans in the Ministry of Defence in July 2016. He became Deputy Commander NATO Air Command Afghanistan, Headquarters Resolute Support in April 2019.

In February 2020 Maddison was appointed Air Officer Commanding No. 22 Group with effect from August 2020.

Maddison was appointed an Officer of the Order of the British Empire in the 2011 Birthday Honours.

Personal life
Maddison attended English Martyrs School and Sixth Form College in Hartlepool.

References

Living people
Year of birth missing (living people)
Officers of the Order of the British Empire
Royal Air Force air marshals
Recipients of the Commendation for Valuable Service
People educated at English Martyrs School and Sixth Form College